The Landrentestelsel (literally: Land Securities System) was a system of taxation in the Dutch East Indies, in which the indigenous population paid 2/5 of its agricultural products grown or a similar sum to the colonial administration. It was replaced with the Cultivation System by Johannes van den Bosch in 1830.

References

Dutch East Indies
Taxation in Indonesia
Legal history of Indonesia